Tetrazine is a compound that consists of a six-membered aromatic ring containing four nitrogen atoms with the molecular formula C2H2N4.  The name tetrazine is used in the nomenclature of derivatives of this compound. Three core-ring isomers exist: 1,2,3,4-tetrazines, 1,2,3,5-tetrazines, and 1,2,4,5-tetrazines, also known as v-tetrazines, as-tetrazines and s-tetrazines respectively.

1,2,3,4-Tetrazines
1,2,3,4-Tetrazines are often isolated fused to an aromatic ring system and are stabilized as the dioxide derivatives.

1,2,4,5-Tetrazine
1,2,4,5-Tetrazines are very well known and myriad 3,6-disubstituted 1,2,4,5-tetrazines are known. These materials are of use in the area of energetic chemistry. 

The compound 3,6-di-2-pyridyl-1,2,4,5-tetrazine' has two pyridine substituents and is of importance as a reagent in Diels-Alder reactions. It reacts with norbornadiene in a sequence of one DA reaction and two retro-DA reactions to cyclopentadiene and a pyridazine with exchange of an acetylene unit:

With norbornadiene fused to an arene the reaction stops at an intermediary stage

See also

 6-membered rings with one nitrogen atom: pyridine
 6-membered rings with two nitrogen atoms: diazines
 6-membered rings with three nitrogen atoms: triazines
 6-membered rings with five nitrogen atoms: pentazine
 6-membered rings with six nitrogen atoms: hexazine

References